Hesperia (born Olga Mambelli; 9 July 1885 – 30 May 1959) was an Italian actress. She appeared in more than sixty films and shorts from 1912 to 1938. She was married to the director Baldassarre Negroni.

Selected filmography

References

External links 

1885 births
1959 deaths
People from Bertinoro
Italian film actresses
Italian silent film actresses
20th-century Italian actresses